Emily Gregory may refer to:
Emily Lovira Gregory (1840-1897), American botanist.
Emily Ray Gregory (1863-1946), American zoologist.